Scheer may refer to:

People
Al Scheer (1888–1959), American Major League Baseball player
Alexander Scheer (born 1976), German actor and musician
Andrew Scheer (born 1979), Canadian politician and Leader of the Opposition 2017–20
August-Wilhelm Scheer (born 1941), German professor of business administration
Brad Scheer (born 1998), Australian rules footballer
Carl Scheer (1936–2019), American basketball executive
Chloe Scheer (born 1999), Australian rules footballer
Christopher Scheer (born 1968), American journalist
Dolph van der Scheer (1909–1966), Dutch speed skater
Edna Scheer (1926–2000), All-American Girls Professional Baseball League player
Eva Scheer (1915–1999), Norwegian journalist, literary critic, translator and author
Gene Scheer (born 1958), American songwriter, librettist and lyricist
Heinie Scheer (1900–1976), American Major League Baseball player
Hermann Scheer (1944–2010), German politician and renewable energy advocate
Jens Scheer (1935–1994), German physicist
Jim Scheer (born 1953), American politician
Julian Scheer (1926–2001), American merchant mariner, journalist, public relations professional, and author
K. H. Scheer (1928–1991), Germany science fiction writer
Klaus Scheer (born 1950), German football player and manager 
Marc Alexander Scheer (born 1979), German sprinter
Mary Scheer (born 1963), American actress
Maximilian Scheer (1896–1978), German journalist and author
Monique Scheer (born 1967), American anthropologist
Nina Scheer (born 1971), German lawyer and politician
Paul Scheer (born 1976), American comedian
Pitty Scheer (1925–1997), Luxembourgian cyclist
Regina Scheer (born 1950), German writer and historian
Reinhard Scheer (1863–1928), German admiral
Richard Scheer (born 1974), Franco-Seychellois weightlifter
Robert Scheer (born 1936), American journalist
Roger P. Scheer (born 1934), United States Air Force general
Sherie Scheer (born 1940), American photographer
Tamara Scheer (born 1979), Austrian historian

Other uses
IDS Scheer, software company founded by August-Wilhelm Scheer
Scheer (band), Irish alternative rock band
Scheer, Germany, town in Baden-Württemberg
German cruiser Admiral Scheer